Silvano Ciampi (born 22 February 1932) is an Italian racing cyclist. He won stage 6 of the 1958 Giro d'Italia.

Major results
Sources:

1952
 1st Firenze - Mare
1956
 1st Firenze - Mare
 1st Gp Industria del Cuoio
 1st Coppa Lanciotto Ballerini
1957
 1st Gran Piemonte
 1st Gran Premio Industria e Commercio di Prato
 1st Trofeo Matteotti
 2nd Coppa Bernocchi
 5th Coppa Sabatini
1958
 1st Stage 6 Giro d'Italia
 3rd Giro della Provincia di reggio Calabria
 7th Giro di Toscana
1959
 1st Gran Piemonte
 1st Giro di Romagna
 1st Giro dell'Appennino
 2nd Trofeo Matteotti
 8th Giro dell'Emilia
 9th Milano-Vignola
1960
 9th Giro di Lombardia
1961
 1st Stage 14 Giro d'Italia
 4th Milano-Vignola
 5th Overall Roma–Napoli–Roma
1st Stages 3 & 6a
 6th Overall Tre Giorni del Sud
 6th Giro di Romagna
 7th Gran Piemonte
 10th Tre Valli Varesine
1962
 1st Giro di Campania
 5th Trofeo Matteotti
1963
 2nd Giro dell'Emilia
 3rd Giro del Lazio
 5th Tre Valli Varesine
 8th Giro dell'Appennino
1964
 9th Trofeo Laigueglia
1985
 3rd GP la Torre

Grand Tour general classification results timeline

References

External links
 

1932 births
Living people
Italian male cyclists
Italian Giro d'Italia stage winners
Place of birth missing (living people)
Sportspeople from the Province of Pistoia
Cyclists from Tuscany